The Cleburne County Farm Cemetery is located at Plantation Drive East and Deer Run in Heber Springs, Arkansas.  It is a small cemetery, with seventeen graves, ten of which have markers.  It is surrounded by a chain-link fence, and there is a commemorative marker.  The cemetery saw active use from 1896 to 1943, and is the only surviving element of the county's poor farm, which was used by the county to provide for its indigent population during that time.

The 132 acre "Poor Farm" was established in 1896. From 1935 to 1942 the farm was a Civilian Conservation Corps (CCC) camp and the County Farms was closed. 
The cemetery was listed on the National Register of Historic Places in 2005.

See also
 National Register of Historic Places listings in Cleburne County, Arkansas

References

External links
 

Cemeteries on the National Register of Historic Places in Arkansas
Buildings and structures completed in 1896
Buildings and structures in Cleburne County, Arkansas
National Register of Historic Places in Cleburne County, Arkansas
Cemeteries established in the 1890s